Maybelle "May" Parker-Jameson (née Reilly), commonly known as Aunt May, is a fictional character appearing in American comic books published by Marvel Comics, commonly in association with the superhero Spider-Man. Making her first full appearance in Amazing Fantasy #15 (August 1962), the character was created by writer Stan Lee and artist Steve Ditko, playing an influential role in the Spider-Man comic books.

May is the widow of Ben Parker and the paternal aunt of Peter Parker, who leads a secret life as Spider-Man. She is nurturing and supportive of Peter as a mother figure, although throughout most of Spider-Man's history, she has not known of his secret life and considered Spider-Man frightening. In modern renditions, May has been known to support the hero and in rare cases is aware that he is her nephew or at least suspecting his identity as Peter. Later in life, she marries J. Jonah "Jay" Jameson Sr., the estranged father of Peter's boss and Spider-Man's harshest critic J. Jonah Jameson, making him her step-son and by extension Peter's step-cousin (and self-declared step-brother); much to Jameson's discomfort.

Since May's conception, the character has appeared in several media adaptations of Spider-Man, often playing a supporting role. May was portrayed by Rosemary Harris in Sam Raimi's Spider-Man trilogy, Sally Field in Marc Webb's The Amazing Spider-Man duology and Marisa Tomei in the Marvel Cinematic Universe films. The character was voiced by Lily Tomlin in the 2018 animated film, Spider-Man: Into the Spider-Verse.

Fictional character biography
May Parker (née Reilly) was born in Brooklyn, New York on May 5. After the death of her brother-in-law and his wife, May and her husband Ben Parker took in their only nephew, Peter, and raised him at their home at 20 Ingram Street, Forest Hills, Queens, having previously cared for mermaid Linda Brown by the beachside in their earlier years. She remained an important influence in Peter's life even during college as she was the only family he had left. Her continued belief that Peter was still the fragile boy he had been before he gained his powers could be frustrating at times.

In the early years of his superhero career, Peter feared for May's well-being and the fatal shock that he believed would end her life if she ever learned about his dual identity as Spider-Man. Consequently, Peter often felt anguish over dealing with major crises while his aunt needed nearly constant care. This conflict took on an unusual turn when May became sweethearts with his enemy, Otto Octavius (also known as Doctor Octopus), and Peter struggled to deal with his enemy's schemes while not hurting his aunt.

During a period of convalescence at a nursing home, May met wheelchair user Nathan Lubensky. Gradually, May and Nathan fell in love with each other. She invited Nathan into her Forest Hills home after converting it into a boarding house, and the couple were briefly engaged. However, May's heart was broken when Nathan suffered a fatal heart attack while protecting her from being taken hostage by Adrian Toomes, the costumed villain known as the Vulture. Some time thereafter, a guilt-stricken Toomes confronted May, begging her to forgive him for his role in Nathan's death. (Ironically, Nathan had befriended Toomes when the two briefly resided at the same nursing home). May refused to do so, stating that only God could provide the villain with the redemption he was seeking.

As part of a plan by Peter's arch-foe Norman Osborn, May was replaced by a "genetically-altered actress" who impersonated her while May was held captive by villains until the actress died, Osborn returning May to Peter with a device planted inside her that would detonate a series of gene bombs if removed, decimating Earth. Mister Fantastic was able to disable the device without removing it, saving the world and May, who apparently retained no memory of her time in captivity. May finally learned about her nephew's secret life when she walked into his room after he had sustained a serious beating from the villain Morlun, the two later talking about May's discovery as May came to accept her nephew's real life.

When Spider-Man joins the Avengers, Peter, Aunt May, and Mary Jane Watson move into Stark Tower after May loses her house to a fire. During the Superhero Civil War, she and Mary Jane convince Peter to unmask himself in front of a press conference. Later, she is targeted by the Chameleon, but outwits the villain by feeding him Ambien-filled oatmeal-raisin cookies.

When Peter changes his mind about the Superhuman Registration Act, he moves his family from Stark Tower to a motel. An assassin hired by the Kingpin tries to kill Peter, but hits May instead. Peter takes May to a hospital where she lapses into a coma and is likely to die. However, Aunt May receives a radioactive blood transfusion from Peter, which he hoped would save her life due to his mutated healing factor.

The demon Mephisto offers to restore May's health in exchange for erasing Peter's marriage from history, and Peter and Mary Jane agree. May lives, and Spider-Man's identity is once again a secret.

At the beginning of Brand New Day, May is doing volunteer work for a homeless shelter, run by Martin Li, the supervillain crime boss Mister Negative. At this point, her knowledge of Peter being Spider-Man was erased. During her work at the shelter, she met John Jonah "Jay" Jameson (the father of J. Jonah Jameson) and started a relationship with him. The following issue, Peter caught the two of them in bed. However, he approved of this relationship, mainly because Jay supports Spider-Man, who had previously saved his life, and saw through Norman Osborn as a thug who holds nothing but contempt for the people.

Jay walked with May in Central Park and asked her to marry him, and May accepted. Despite Doctor Octopus' subconscious efforts to halt his former fiancé's wedding plans, May and Jay were reluctantly wedded by New York Mayor J. Jonah Jameson, who expressed displeasure at Peter calling them stepbrothers (due to May being his adoptive mother).

Aunt May has several blood relatives that are still alive, including a sister named Jan. May's first cousins Sam and Julia are the children of her uncle Bill and his wife Claudia. Peter was attracted to Julia's daughter Alexa. The Reilly family is currently staying in May's house.

Upon her return from her honeymoon, she stops by the FEAST offices, only to accidentally walk in on Martin Li, along with Hammerhead torturing one of Mr. Negative's Inner Demons. Trying to escape, Li touches her with his corrupting touch. She then returns to meet her husband and Peter. When Jay suggests going somewhere nice for dinner, Aunt May sarcastically proceeds to insult Peter over his fluctuating jobs and his dependence on them, culminating with calling her nephew "One damn big disappointment". A heartbroken Peter runs off. Peter returns, after a physically and mentally exhausting battle against the Lizard, tries talking to Aunt May, looking for someone to help give him hope after seeing the death of Curt Connors' humanity. She still continues to act like a bad-tempered teenager and at first, rebuffs him. However, after seeing Peter clearly suffering mentally, she feels guilty and undergoes an intense mind battle, breaking the corruption, and is shown simply sitting next to Peter.

Prior to the events of Spider-Island, after Martin Li's secret identity is exposed to the public, May and Jay formally announce their intention to leave New York for good, for their own safety, and move to Boston. Jay explains this was the result of all the recent major incidents towards them and their friends and family. They put May's old house up for sale and leave once the moving van is packed. After spending their last night in New York at Jay's apartment, the following day she and Jay head to an airport in New Jersey with Peter and Carlie and they say their goodbyes before flying off. Following the Ends of the Earth storyline, when May and Jay are returning home to New York on their private jet, but the irresponsible superhero Alpha uses his powers without care in his battle with Terminus causes many aircraft to shut down. The Avengers rescue everybody and Spider-Man saves his May and Jay from Jameson's malfunctioning private jet just before it crashes. Later Peter arrives at the hospital to see that his Aunt May and Jay are okay, although she has sustained minor nerve damage to her leg that will require the use of a cane for the rest of her life. In The Superior Spider-Man storyline, Aunt May's leg is fully healed from operation and completion surgery with gratitude of Doctor Wirtham.

As part of the All-New, All-Different Marvel, May and Jay became part of the Parker Industries's foundation, a charity focused on providing help for the less fortunate and raise the quality of life wherever it could be possible. However, her husband Jay had coughed up blood and collapsed. Aunt May is heartbroken after her husband Jay had later died in the hospital. Aunt May, Peter and J. Jonah Jameson held a moment of silence.

After Peter Parker had his doctorate revoked for "copying" Doctor Octopus' thesis and getting fired from the Daily Bugle, May confronted her nephew about his actions. While stating that he should take responsibility for his actions, May leaves stating that Uncle Ben should have raised him better. Shortly afterwards, she was diagnosed with cancer and does not tell Peter to avoid overwhelming him.

Other versions

Original appearance
Lee and Ditko introduced the character of "Aunt May" alongside "Uncle Ben" in the June 1962 issue of Strange Tales #97, four months before her Amazing Fantasy debut. In the story "Goodbye to Linda Brown," the characters are given no surname. They care for a young woman named Linda Brown who develops a sleepwalking habit, just like May and Ben used to have. When Linda sleepwalks to the sea in her wheelchair, she becomes a mermaid.

Golden Oldie
May Parker was transformed by Galactus into the cosmically powered being Golden Oldie to serve as his herald. Rather than lead him to populated worlds, Oldie discovered an extraterrestrial baker who bakes planet-sized snack cakes that sate Galactus's hunger. May's transformation is ultimately revealed as a dream. The issue, a parody of an old Hostess snack cake advertising campaign, was part of Marvel's "Assistant Editors Month" series of humorous issues.

May also appeared as "Golden Oldie" (this time an Iron Man parody) as well as "The Astonishing Aunt Ant" and "Auntie Freeze" in an issue of What If?.

MC2
In the alternate timeline known as MC2, May Parker's death in The Amazing Spider-Man #400 was valid. It was May who died in this continuum, rather than an actress. Peter's daughter, May "Mayday" Parker, was named for her. Mayday became the super-heroine Spider-Girl and met the original May when she found herself displaced in time, although Mayday makes no attempt to explain who she really was.

When Spider-Girl was trapped in an illusion by her enemy, Misery, she was given encouragement from a familiar spirit. She recognised the spirit as being Aunt May.

In the final arc of Amazing Spider-Girl, Aunt May acts a spiritual advisor to May in order to help her grandniece reclaim her identity and save Peter from Norman Osborn. In this form, she initially appears as a younger version of herself, which prevents May from recognizing her. However, May finally figures it out when she sees Aunt May through her father's eyes.

Spider-Man: Life Story
In this continuity, the characters age naturally after Peter Parker became Spider-Man in 1962. Sometime before 1977, May married Otto Octavius, but she later divorced him due to his anger management problems. In the 1980s, Mary Jane struggles to take care of May as she shows early signs of dementia around the time Mary Jane and Peter's twins are born. It puts a further rift in Peter and Mary Jane's marriage as Peter refuses to put her in a senior's home while Mary Jane is sick of being the sole caretaker of May and their children. Mary Jane later leaves Peter and takes the twins with her as Peter looks after May. May later dies sometime before 1995. When Otto attempts to destroy Peter's mind in 2019, Peter uses a memory of May to convince Otto to stop fighting Spider-Man and accept his life's limitations. The conjured memory version of May has one final talk with Peter before he saves the world from Doctor Doom's reign at the cost of his life.

Spider-Verse
During the "Spider-Verse" storyline, there are different versions of Aunt May that are featured:

 An alternate Aunt May from Earth-14512 appears in a flashback along with her version of Uncle Ben. They are depicted as scientists and the ones who informed Peni Parker that she was the only person able to carry on the SP//dr project after her father, the original pilot, died in battle. Peni accepted the responsibility, allowing the radioactive spider that formed the other half of SP//dr's CPU to bite her. When Addy Brock lost control of the VEN#m, May flew in to the mech in order to manually shut it down, only to be consumed by it. After SP//dr defeats VEN#m, she finds Addy and May gone.
 In an unknown reality, Aunt May and Uncle Ben are with their nephew Peter at the hospital after he suffers an allergic reaction to the radioactive spider bite, leaving him in a coma. Because of this, they are out of their house when it is burgled by the thief that killed Ben in the 616 universe. Peter transforms into Man-Spider and attacks May and Ben, but gets stopped by Spider-Man Noir. Six-Armed Spider-Man creates a cure for this Peter, allowing him to live a normal life with May and Ben.
 On Earth-803, May Reilly is a young woman living in a 19th-century steampunk-inspired New York. Her father studied animals, and one day when she let a spider out of its cage to get it comfort and to pet it, she got bit and learned that it was important not to let anyone cage her. After her father died, she used spare parts to create a suit with four mechanical arms that allowed her to climb walls as well as web shooters. While attending a ball, the mayor was kidnapped by the Six Men of Sinestry, so she stepped in to stop them; making her debut as the Lady Spider. Though the villains manage to get the mayor's plans, she defeats them and forces them to retreat. Following this, she is recruited into the Spider-Army. The Inheritors attacked them, separating her from the rest, though she accompanied Spider-Man 2099 to his dimension to fend off the Inheritor Daemos. They then traveled to Earth-13 before going back to her dimension to fix the Japanese Spider-Man's Leopardon before they piloted it into battle against the Inheritors in Loomworld.
 Earth-11's May Parker is the aunt of Penelope Parker, who told her about the spider bite she received during an accident at Osborn Labs, how she developed spider-like abilities, and how she wanted to hide her powers so people would think she was normal. However, Aunt May convinced her niece being normal was overrated and that she should embrace what happened to her in order to help people.
 On Earth-3123, Aunt May is known as Spider-Ma'am. She ended up getting bitten by the radioactive spider instead of Peter as she showed up to the science demonstration to give Peter his lunch. After revealing her identity to Ben and Peter, Peter develops web shooters and the two help May with her heroic activities on the sidelines. During the events of Spider-Verse, she and her family were confronted by Karn of the Inheritors. Sensing that he was too strong for her, she proposed to offer her life for the sake of her family, causing Karn to temporarily hesitate as she reminded him of his mother. He nearly killed her, but several multiversal Spider-Men intervened and convinced him to join them. During the "Spider-Geddon" storyline, Spider-Ma'am joined the fight against the Inheritors. When the villains are defeated, Superior Spider-Man cloned them as babies. After talking with her husband, Spider-Ma'am agreed to take them in as foster children.

Spider-Geddon
During the "Spider-Geddon" storyline, an unidentified Earth has a Hispanic version of May who is unaware that her husband and nephew have spider powers after a blood transfusion saved Uncle Ben's life.

Amazing Spider-Man: Renew Your Vows
In this Secret Wars Warzone, when Peter is captured by Regent and his life is flashing before his eyes, one of his memories was him standing in front of Aunt May's open casket at her funeral, confirming that she died sometime before the events of the comic.

Ultimate Marvel
In the Ultimate Marvel universe Aunt May is based on writer Brian Michael Bendis' mother. This version of the character is a strong and independent woman in her late forties or early fifties, significantly younger than her original Marvel Universe counterpart. She is the biological sister of Mary Parker, and wife to Ben Parker.

Peter reveals his secret identity to May after he finds Gwen Stacy's clone at her old house, resulting in May evicting Peter from her home, as she despises Spider-Man. This coincides with the appearance of a man who appears to be Richard Parker, Peter's father. Peter learns that May had known this man, actually an artificially-aged clone of Peter, and she kept this secret from Peter to "protect him". After a long talk between Peter and his "father", Nick Fury and a team of Spider Slayers surround the Parker home, which triggers a transformation in Gwen, turning her into Carnage. May then suffers a heart attack. She is rescued from dying by Sue Storm of the Fantastic Four, reconciles with Peter and accepts his life as Spider-Man, though she is not at all fond of his costume. Peter later explains to May why he became Spider-Man, and May tells him that Ben would be proud of him for doing so. Aunt May is by Peter's side when he dies following a battle with the Green Goblin.

Although angry at the Ultimates for belittling Peter's accomplishments in life when attending her nephew's funeral, May is nevertheless comforted when she met some of the people that Peter had saved during his career as Spider-Man, one little girl even offering her a comforting hug as thanks for raising the man who saved her. After the funeral, May and Gwen decide to take up Tony Stark's offer to set themselves up for a new life in France.

However, following the emergence of a new Spider-Man, May and Gwen return to New York. Though Captain America threatens to arrest Miles' parents and expose his secret to them unless he retires the Spider-Man identity, May and Gwen are more supportive of Miles, and May gives him Peter's old web-shooters, along with the formula for the web-fluid, encouraging him to carry on Peter's legacy.

During the Spider-Men miniseries, May and Gwen are back in the United States, presumably to oversee the selling of the Parker Residence and to finish Gwen's term at Midtown High. They encounter someone wearing a red-and-blue Spider-Man costume and believe he is a lunatic who is disrespecting Peter's memory. They become angry and threaten to call the police. When the person unmasks himself, they are stunned beyond belief to see the older, more mature Peter Parker, from the Marvel 616 universe. She initially is unconvinced that this Peter is who he says he is, but both she and Gwen later realize he is being truthful when he knows Uncle Ben's admonishment about power and responsibility. May is greatly moved at realizing that she has now been given the chance for closure that she had missed when her Peter died, and concludes that she had made the right choices concerning her nephew, before the adult Peter is returned to his universe.

When Green Goblin escapes custody after S.H.I.E.L.D. was shut down, he arrives at the front yard of Aunt May's house and confronts Miles. Aunt May and Gwen are inside watching the television where the battle of Miles and Green Goblin was being broadcast. Soon, a very much alive Peter emerges to aid Miles in the fight, to the surprise of Aunt May and Gwen. Green Goblin flees at his arrival and the two Spider-Men depart. Gwen is unsure of the identity of the original Spider-Man, but Aunt May assures her that his motives show that it is him. Later, Aunt May and Gwen walk over to Mary Jane's house and overhear Peter's unknown resurrection. Aunt May sprints over and joyfully reunites with her nephew. After the two Spider-Men defeat Green Goblin, Peter tells Aunt May that he intends to go on a quest to find out the truth of his mystery resurrection.

In other media

Television
 May Parker appeared in the 1960s Spider-Man series, voiced by Peg Dixon.
 May Parker appears in the 1977 Spider-Man television film and its follow-up television series The Amazing Spider-Man, portrayed by Jeff Donnell and Irene Tedrow respectively.
 May Parker appeared in the 1980s Spider-Man series, voiced by Morgan Lofting.
 May Parker appeared in Spider-Man and His Amazing Friends, voiced by June Foray. This version's house serves as the Spider-Friends' headquarters, though she remains unaware of their activities.
 May Parker appeared in the 1990s Spider-Man series, voiced by Linda Gary (in the first three seasons) and Julie Bennett (in the final two seasons). This version displays a strong dislike of Spider-Man, but loves Peter Parker dearly. Additionally, she is friends with Keane Marlowe and Anna Watson, despite the latter's lack of respect for Peter, and goes on to give her and her husband Ben's wedding rings to Peter and Mary Jane Watson.
 May Parker appeared in The Spectacular Spider-Man, voiced by Deborah Strang. In season one, she suffers a heart attack while seeing a show on Broadway with her friend Anna Watson amidst Spider-Man's fight with the Sinister Six. Due to the Venom symbiote's influence, Peter is unaware of what happened until Mary Jane Watson tells him May was hospitalized. By the season finale, May is released and has Thanksgiving dinner with Peter, her physician Doctor Bromwell, and Captain George and Gwen Stacy. In season two, May has fully recovered, though Peter remains concerned for her, and has taken a mutual liking to Bromwell.
 May Parker appears in Ultimate Spider-Man, voiced by Misty Lee. This version is in her late 40s and is less fragile than traditional depictions. Additionally, she is shown to be involved in various hobbies such as yoga and cooking classes. In season three, May reveals that she knew Peter Parker's secret identity as Spider-Man and assures her nephew that she is proud of him. In season four, May helps reform the Scarlet Spider, and is the one who suggests naming him Ben.
 An alternate reality version of May from Miles Morales' universe appears in the episode "Return to the Spider-Verse" Pt. 4, also voiced by Lee. After Morales is stranded in Peter's universe, she went on to help Spider-Woman fight crime.
 May Parker appears in Marvel's Spider-Man, voiced by Nancy Linari. This version is not as elderly as traditional depictions. 
 May Parker appears in Spidey and His Amazing Friends, voiced by Melanie Minichino.

Film
 May Parker appears in Sam Raimi's Spider-Man trilogy, portrayed by Rosemary Harris. This version is a housewife who is left widowed during the first film and encourages her nephew Peter Parker with words of wisdom like her husband Ben had before his death.
 In Spider-Man (2002), May and Ben care for Peter until Ben is shot and killed, seemingly by a Dennis Carradine. After mourning for Ben, Peter moves into an apartment with his friend Harry Osborn, though May comes to visit him on Thanksgiving. She is later attacked by the Green Goblin and temporarily hospitalized.
 In Spider-Man 2 (2004), May continues to look after Peter. However, due to financial difficulties following Ben's death, she is forced to sell her home and move into a small apartment. She initially holds a low opinion of Spider-Man until she is kidnapped by Otto Octavius. After helping Spider-Man defeat him, she changes her mind about the web-slinger. When Peter's powers begin to wane and he quits being Spider-Man, May encourages him to resume his heroic activities and expresses guilt for essentially causing Ben's death. Peter reveals the part he played in it, leaving May initially stunned and saddened, though she later thanks Peter for telling the truth and it is implied that she deduced his superhero identity. Following this, Peter uses May's words to help Octavius see the error of his ways.
 In Spider-Man 3 (2007), Peter tells May he plans on proposing to Mary Jane Watson, so May provides advice and gives him her engagement ring to use in his proposal. She and Peter later learn that Flint Marko had killed Ben, leading to Peter seeking revenge due in part to his black suit's influence. When he tells her of Marko's apparent demise, May warns him of the dangers of taking vengeance as she had already forgiven Marko and Ben would not have wanted Peter to seek revenge. After removing the black suit, a guilt-ridden Peter attempts to return the ring, but May refuses, knowing he will make things right.
 May Parker appears in The Amazing Spider-Man and The Amazing Spider-Man 2, portrayed by Sally Field. This version is slightly younger than previous depictions. Additionally, in the latter film, she has become a nursing student to support herself and her nephew Peter Parker financially after he graduates from high school.
 May Parker appears in films set in the Marvel Cinematic Universe (MCU), portrayed by Marisa Tomei. This version is much younger than previous depictions and is Italian American.
 In Captain America: Civil War (2016), May is visited by Tony Stark, who came to her apartment to recruit her nephew Peter Parker, and is initially unaware of Peter's activities as Spider-Man.
 In Spider-Man: Homecoming (2017), May expresses concern over the criminal activity that Spider-Man is involved in and assists Peter in preparing for his Homecoming dance. She later witnesses Peter changing into his Spider-Man suit and learns his secret identity, reacting in shock.
 In Avengers: Endgame (2019), May is revived off-screen along with other victims of the Blip by Bruce Banner and attends Stark's funeral with Peter.
 In Spider-Man: Far From Home (2019), May became a prominent figure in a local charity drive that supports others who were revived following the Blip, citing her own experience when she found herself homeless and reappeared in her apartment with its new residents. Additionally, she fully supports Peter's activities as Spider-Man and enters a brief relationship with Happy Hogan.
 In Spider-Man: No Way Home (2021), after Mysterio publicly reveals Peter's secret identity, May is taken into the Department of Damage Control's custody, though Matt Murdock has the charges dropped. Later, as a result of Peter's attempt to have Doctor Strange undo Mysterio's actions, several alternate universe-displaced supervillains arrive in their world. May befriends Norman Osborn and encourages her nephew to cure the villains in order to change their fates by convincing him that they still deserve a second chance in life. After the Green Goblin takes over Osborn's body, he mortally wounds May, who dies in Peter's arms after telling him "with great power, there must also come great responsibility."
 May Parker appears in Spider-Man: Into the Spider-Verse, voiced by Lily Tomlin. After her nephew Peter Parker dies, she ends up housing "Spider-People" from across the multiverse and gives them access to her Peter's underground hideout. She later assists Miles Morales in creating his own Spider-Man suit and provides him with modified versions of Peter's web shooters.

Video games
 May Parker makes a cameo appearance in Marvel Super Heroes vs. Street Fighter.
 May Parker appears in the Spider-Man 2 film tie-in game, voiced by Mindy Sterling.
 May Parker appears in Lego Marvel Super Heroes voiced by Kari Wahlgren.
 May appears in The Amazing Spider-Man 2 film tie-in game, voiced by Diane Michelle.
 May Parker's Spider-Ma'am and Lady Spider counterparts appear as playable characters in Spider-Man Unlimited.
 May Parker appears as a playable character in Lego Marvel Super Heroes 2, with her Lady Spider counterpart appearing later as a DLC character.
 May Parker appears in Marvel's Spider-Man, voiced again by Nancy Linari. This version volunteers at Martin Li's homeless assistance group F.E.A.S.T. and is later put in charge of one its centers after Li turns into Mister Negative to seek revenge on Mayor Norman Osborn. After Otto Octavius releases the Devil's Breath virus on New York as part of his own plans to seek revenge on Osborn, May falls victim to it, but continues to help others until she is left bed-ridden. While her nephew Peter Parker procures an anti-serum, there is not enough to mass-produce it in time to save her and the rest of New York. Despite this, she urges him not to use it on her, admits she knew of his work as Spider-Man, and expresses how proud she is of him before dying. Following this, May is buried next to her husband Ben Parker and a standing commemorative plaque is added to the F.E.A.S.T. center she worked at in her honor.

See also
 Spider-Man: Back in Black
 Spider-Man: One More Day
 Spider-Man: Brand New Day
 One Moment in Time (comics)

References

External links
 
Comic Bfugutook Awards Almanac
The Women of Marvel Comic's Aunt May Page
 Aunt May's Profile at Spiderfan.org 
 May Reilly at Marvel Wiki

Fictional characters from New York City
Comics characters introduced in 1962
Spider-Man characters
Marvel Comics film characters
Characters created by Stan Lee
Characters created by Steve Ditko
Marvel Comics female characters